Fine Upstanding Citizen is a 2005 album by American singer-songwriter Maia Sharp.

Reception
Writing for Allmusic, Thom Jurek gave the album three and a half stars out of five. He said that it "won't set the charts on fire" but called it "a mature mark from an under-the-radar artist". He cited the track "Fall Like Margarite" as a highlight, calling it "simply gorgeous." Ronni Radner of Out called the album "an impressive set of thoughtfully crafted songs" and said that it "pays a definite homage to [...] trailblazing femme troubadours" like Bonnie Raitt, Rickie Lee Jones and Carole King.

Track listing
"Red Dress" (Richey, Sharp) – 4:02
"Something Wild" (Dulaney, Sharp) – 3:57
"A Home" (Sharp, Sharp) – 4:37
"The Reminder" (Fisher, Sharp) – 3:56
"Regular Jane" (Majors, Sharp) – 3:37
"Flood" (Robin, Sharp) – 2:30
"Kinder Blues" (Addison, Sharp) – 5:06
"Firefly" (Poltz, Sharp) – 3:19
"Wisdom" (Crowley, Sharp) – 3:21
"Fall Like Margarite" (Middleman, Sharp) – 2:50
"Come Back to Me" (Batteau, Sharp) – 4:09
"Fine Upstanding Citizen" (Coppola, Rowe, Sharp) – 2:18

Personnel

Music
Mark Addison – bass, mandolin, piano, electric guitar, melodica, Indian banjo
David Batteau – acoustic guitar
Chris Carmichael – violin, viola
Andy Georges – acoustic guitar, banjo, harmonica, mandolin, electric guitar
Mickey Grimm – percussion, drums
David Henry – cello
Brad Jones – organ, acoustic guitar, bass, mandolin, piano, bass guitar, harmonium, timpani, vibraphone, nylon string guitar
Richard Julian – backing vocals
Will Kimbrough – percussion, electric guitar, backing vocals
Ronnie Manaog – percussion, drums, tambourine, shaker
Greg Morrow – drums
Kim Richey – backing vocals
Janet Robin – acoustic guitar, electric guitar
Joshua Segal – violin, viola
Maia Sharp – acoustic guitar, clarinet, flute, electric guitar, piano, saxophone, djembe, vocals
Randy Sharp – acoustic guitar, mandolin, backing vocals, bass harmonica
Nina Singh – percussion, drums
Jill Sobule – voices
Josef Zimmerman – bass, bass guitar

Production
Mark Addison – producer, sampling, loop
Tom Briggs – creative director
Jeff Chenault – creative director
Jim DeMain – mastering
Jeremy Ferguson – engineer
Andy Georges – sampling
Brad Jones – producer, engineer, sampling, mixing, audio production
Bonnie Raitt – author
Maia Sharp – producer, engineer, audio production
Randy Sharp – producer, engineer, sampling
Design
Jeff Chenault – art direction, design
Donna Gast – make-up, hair stylist
Zoe Joeright – stylist
Mitch Tobias – photography, composite

References

2005 albums
Maia Sharp albums
E1 Music albums